is the sixth show in the Ultra Series. Produced by Tsuburaya Productions, the series aired on Tokyo Broadcasting System from April 6, 1973, to April 5, 1974, with a total of 53 episodes.

Plot
Kotaro Higashi is a wanderer who joined ZAT during his return to Japan, but his aircraft crashed and he died from severe burns while fighting Astromons. The Five Ultra Brothers brought Kotaro's body to their home world of Nebula M-78 as Mother of Ultra warped him with the Brothers' own light, turning Kōtarō into Ultraman Taro, who would now form the Six Ultra Brothers. Kotaro was taken back to Earth and defeated the aforementioned monster as his first opponent. Many foes were found that would threaten the Earth, but Taro and ZAT defeated them time and time again with occasional help from the other five Ultra Brothers and from the weaklings of monsters only Taro could defeat. During Taro's era, Birdon killed him and Zoffy but Taro was revived and killed the bird monster. After Samekujira's death, Kotaro declared his intention to continue as a human and returned the Ultra Badge back to the Mother of Ultra. Valky would return to hunt the now-human Kotaro but the latter used his own skills and quick thinking to kill the alien by luring him to an oil refinery. The series ended with ZAT bidding farewell to Kotaro as he left for parts unknown.

In the original series, Ultraman Taro was meant to be Kotaro's transformed form (while the Ultra Brothers and Mother and Father of Ultra were regarded as his non-blood family members), which explained his absence in Ultraman Leo. The Ultraman Story movie in 1984 would retcon this into providing a story of Taro being raised on the Land of Light, with Mother and Father of Ultra being his biological parents and his training was shown before he left for Earth.

Cast
: 
: 
: 
: 
: 
: 
/: 
: 
: 
: 
: , 
: 
Narrator: , Akira Nagoya

Episodes
The Ultra Mother is Like the Sun
At That Moment the Ultra Mother Was
The Ultra Mother Always
Big Sea Turtle Monsters Attack Tokyo!
Parent Star, Child Star, First Star
Jewels are the Monster's Fodder!
Heaven and Hell Island Has Moved!
Dead Spirits of the Man-Eating Marsh
The Day That Tokyo Crumbles
The Fang Cross is a Monster's Grave!
The Blood-Sucking Flower is Young Girl's Spirit
Monster's Solo Journey
The Monster's Cavity Hurts!
Taro's Head Got Chopped Off!
Young Girl of the Blue Will-o-the-Wisp
The Monster's Flute Sounds Ocariyan
Two Big Monsters Close in on Taro!
Zoffy Died! Taro Died Too!
The Ultra Mother Miracle of Love!
Surprise! A Monster Came Raining Down
Tokyo Newtown Sinking
The Wrath of a Child-Carrying Monster!
Gentle Daddy Monster!
This is the Land of Ultra!
Burn on! The Six Ultra Brothers
I Can Conquer Monsters Too!
He's Out! It's Mephirian!
Monster Eleking Barks at the Full Moon!
Bemstar Resurrected! Taro Absolutely Expires!
Counterattack! The Monster Army
Danger! Lying Poison Mushroom
A Nipping Wind Monster! Matasaburoh of the Wind
Five Seconds Before the Great Explosion of the Land of Ultra!
The Last Day of the Six Ultra Brothers!
Certain Kill! Taro's One Blow of Rage!
Coward! The Bride Cried
Monster, Return to Your Homeland!
The Ultra Christmas Tree
Ultra Father and Son Big Mochi-Making Strategy
Go Beyond the Ultra Brothers!
Mother's Wish - A Mid-Winter Cherry-Blossom Blizzard
The Phantom Mother is a Monster User!
Pickle the Monster with Salt!
Oh! Taro is Being Eaten!
She Was Wearing Red Shoes...
The White Rabbit is a Bad Guy!
The Monster Master
Monster Girl's Festival
Sing! Monster Big Match
The Monster Sign is V
The Ultra Father and the Bride Have Come
Steal the Ultra Life!
Farewell Taro! The Ultra Mother!

Songs

Opening song

Lyrics: 
Composition and arrangement: 
Artist: ,

Insert songs

Lyrics: Yū Aku
Composition & Arrangement: Makoto Kawaguchi
Artist: , Mizuumi Boys and Girls Choir
Episodes 18, 25, 33 and 34

Cameo songs

Other appearances

Home media
In July 2019, Mill Creek Entertainment announced that it had acquired most of the Ultraman library from Tsuburaya Productions through Indigo Entertainment, including 1,100 TV episodes and 20 films. The series was released on Blu-ray and digital on January 12, 2021, in standard and steelbook sets.

In July 2020, Shout! Factory announced to have struck a multi-year deal with Alliance Entertainment and Mill Creek, with the blessings of Tsuburaya and Indigo, that granted them the exclusive SVOD and AVOD digital rights to the Ultra series and films (1,100 TV episodes and 20 films) acquired by Mill Creek the previous year. Ultraman Taro, amongst other titles, will stream in the United States and Canada through Shout! Factory TV and Tokushoutsu.

References

External links

Official website of Tsuburaya Productions 
Ultraman Connection — Official website 
Official Ultraman channel at YouTube

1973 Japanese television series debuts
1974 Japanese television series endings
Ultra television series
TBS Television (Japan) original programming